Bray Shop is a village in east Cornwall, England, United Kingdom, in the civil parish of Linkinhorne, Stoke Climsland and South Hill. It is located on the B3257 approximately three miles north-northwest of Callington. It is in the civil parish of Linkinhorne, Stoke Climsland and South Hill.

References

External links

Villages in Cornwall